The Bergisch Gladbach Observatory is an astronomical observatory located in Bergisch Gladbach, Germany, at . Its observatory code is 621. Astronomer Wolf Bickel.

See also
 List of astronomical observatories

References

Astronomical observatories in Germany
Buildings and structures in Rheinisch-Bergischer Kreis